Viking Hockey is an ice hockey team based in Stavanger, Norway. The club was founded in 1998, replacing Viking IK, which had folded in 1996. They played one season in the GET-ligaen, 1998-99. The team colors are blue and they play home matches in Siddishallen.

Famous players
Rob Schistad
Eirik Cecil Paulsen
Kyle McDonough
Tore Vikingstad
Ed Galliani

See also
Stavanger Oilers

External links

Ice hockey teams in Norway
Sport in Stavanger
1998 establishments in Norway
Viking Age in popular culture